"Solsbury Hill" is the debut solo single of English musician Peter Gabriel. He wrote the song about a spiritual experience atop Little Solsbury Hill in Somerset, England, after his departure from the progressive rock band Genesis, of which he had been the lead singer since its inception. The single was a Top 20 hit in the UK, peaking at number 13, and reached number 68 on the Billboard Hot 100 chart in 1977.

Gabriel has said of the song's meaning, "It's about being prepared to lose what you have for what you might get ... It's about letting go."

The song is mostly written in  time, an unusual time signature that has been described as "giving the song a constant sense of struggle". The meter settles into  time only for the last two measures of each chorus. It is performed in the key of B major with a tempo of 102 beats per minute, with Gabriel's vocals ranging from F3 to G4.

Background
Producer Bob Ezrin placed some restrictions on the session musicians to give the song its distinctive sound. While earlier versions of the song featured more prominent electric guitar, Ezrin instructed guitarist Steve Hunter to instead perform the main riff on a 12 string guitar, an instrument "he hadn't played in a long time". However, Hunter states that he instead borrowed a Martin acoustic guitar, and Travis picked the voicings with a capo on the second fret. As Ezrin wanted the acoustic guitar to be tripled, Hunter was required to provide three satisfactory takes, all of which had to be aligned with one another. Bob Ezrin used the variable speed oscillator on guitar tracks to achieve the chorusing effect.

Rather than employ a full drum kit, Allan Schwartzberg placed a shaker in one hand and a drum stick in another, which he used to strike a telephone book. For additional rhythmic textures, Larry Fast constructed a fake drum kit on his keyboard, which he dubbed the "synthibam", although the liner notes credit percussionist Jimmy Maelen with the instrument. After all of the session musicians departed, Fast also overdubbed some additional electronics, including the synth horn orchestration. From verse two onwards, a subdued four note flute riff, played by Gabriel himself, sounds-off the beginning of each section of the lyrics.

Use in soundtracks
It has been used in a number of films and television shows, including the 2001 film Vanilla Sky and the 2004 film In Good Company. It has also been used in the trailer of Finding Dory and featured as the send-off song for the series finale of AMC's Halt and Catch Fire. It was also used for the conclusion of an episode of Fox's 9-1-1. It was used in a Cingular Wireless TV ad campaign, a Toyota ad campaign, and a Nespresso TV ad campaign. 

Its prevalence in romantic comedy trailers has been called "ubiquitous", particularly its inclusion in a satirical re-cut trailer of The Shining.

Track listing

Studio recording

7" UK single (1977)
 "Solsbury Hill" – 3:24
 "Moribund the Burgermeister" – 4:17

7" "Old Gold" single (1982)
 "Solsbury Hill" – 3:26
 "Games Without Frontiers" – 3:50

UK maxi-single (1983, 1988)
 "Solsbury Hill" – 3:24
 "Moribund the Burgermeister" – 4:17
 "Solsbury Hill (Full Length Live Version)" – 5:45

European single (1990 re-issue)
 "Solsbury Hill" – 4:24 / 4:22
 "Shaking the Tree" – 5:06
 "Games Without Frontiers" (Live) – 6:06

Live version

7" US single (1983)
 "Solsbury Hill" (Live) – 3:58
 "I Go Swimming" (Live) – 4:29

7" Netherlands single (1983)
 "Solsbury Hill" (Live) – 4:41
 "Kiss of Life" (Live) – 5:01

7" US single (1983)
 "Solsbury Hill" (Live) – 3:58
 "Shock the Monkey" – 3:58

Personnel
Peter Gabriel – vocals, flute, recorder
Steve Hunter – guitars
Tony Levin – bass guitar
Larry Fast – synths
Allan Schwartzberg – drums, shaker, telephone book
Jimmy Maelen – synthibam
 London Symphony Orchestra

Robert Fripp is often credited. However, he has written:  "I had nothing to add to the track after Steve [Hunter]'s superb & fitting contribution, although I would love to be on it."

Reception
Cash Box said that "its lighthearted feeling should go a long way in expanding his audience beyond the boundaries of so-called 'Progressive Rock.'"  Record World said that "the folk flavored song has an interesting electronic undercurrent." In 2021, it was listed at No. 472 on Rolling Stone's "Top 500 Best Songs of All Time".

Charts

Certifications

Erasure version 

"Solsbury Hill" was recorded by British synthpop duo Erasure in 2003 for their cover versions album Other People's Songs and released as a single in the United Kingdom on 6 January 2003. This Erasure single became a hit, reaching No. 10 on the UK Singles Chart, No. 7 in Denmark, No. 29 in Germany, No. 39 in Sweden, and No. 41 in Ireland. The track was chosen for the album by Erasure member Vince Clarke.

Clarke and singer Andy Bell turned the song into a mid-tempo electronic dance tune, displaying the signature Erasure sound. The band changed the structure of the song from the original  time signature to —except for the chorus, which slips back into  time for one line. This also results in the vocals in the verses effectively being shifted forward in comparison to Gabriel's (which start on beat 5 of each bar) to start on beat 1 of bars 1 and 3.

Clarke directed a music video for the cover which was released on Erasure's DVD compilation Hits! the Videos.

Track listings
CD Single No. 1 (CDMUTE275)
 "Solsbury Hill"	
 "Tell It to Me"
 "Searching"

CD Single No. 2 (LCDMUTE275)
 "Solsbury Hill" (37B mix)
 "Solsbury Hill" (Manhattan Clique extended remix)
 "Ave Maria"

DVD Single (DVDMUTE275)
 "Solsbury Hill" (radio mix)
 "Video Killed the Radio Star"
 "Dr Jeckyll and Mistress Hyde" (short film)

US CD Maxi Single (9200-2)
 "Solsbury Hill" (radio mix)
 "Solsbury Hill"
 "Tell It to Me"
 "Searching"
 "Video Killed the Radio Star" (37B mix)
 "Solsbury Hill" (37B mix)
 "Solsbury Hill" (Manhattan Clique extended remix)
 "Ave Maria"	
 "Dr. Jeckyll And Mistress Hyde" (short film)

Charts

Other cover versions 
In 1989, Canadian singer-songwriter Sarah McLachlan released a cover version on her cd single for "Steaming".

In 1991, Canadian progressive rock band Saga released a cover version of the song in the second disc of the double compilation LP The Works.

In 2010, Lou Reed released a version of the song as part of the project Scratch My Back, with Peter Gabriel recording cover versions of other artists and letting them provide covers of his songs in return. Many of the versions were very different from the original recordings.

In April 2013, an instrumental version of Solsbury Hill was included in guitar player Steve Hunter's album The Manhattan Blues Project. Hunter had played on the original Peter Gabriel (1977 album) recording and he invited his friend and original Solsbury Hill bass player Tony Levin to play bass on the track. In the 2014 biography by Daryl Easley Without Frontiers Gabriel gave Hunter credit for coming up with the guitar parts which became a signature for the song.

In November 2022, singer-songwriter William Fitzsimmons recorded a version for his album "Covers, Vol. 1".

References

1977 debut singles
2003 singles
Peter Gabriel songs
Erasure songs
Song recordings produced by Gareth Jones
Songs written by Peter Gabriel
Song recordings produced by Bob Ezrin
Mute Records singles
1977 songs
Atco Records singles
Charisma Records singles
Geffen Records singles
Progressive pop songs